Jimmy Sprotte (born October 2, 1974) is a former American football linebacker. He played for the Cincinnati Bengals from 1998 to 1999.

References

1974 births
Living people
American football linebackers
Arizona Wildcats football players
Cincinnati Bengals players